Tisagronia is a genus of moths of the family Noctuidae.

Selected species
Tisagronia pexa (Berg, 1877)

References
Natural History Museum Lepidoptera genus database

Noctuinae